The 2018 Superettan is part of the 2018 Swedish football season, and the 18th season of Superettan, Sweden's second-tier football division in its current format. A total of 16 teams contest the league.

Fixtures for the 2018 season were announced on 21 December 2017.

Teams
A total of 16 teams contest the league. The top two teams qualify directly for promotion to Allsvenskan, the third will enter a play-off for the chance of promotion.

Stadia and locations

Personnel and sponsoring
All teams are obligated to have the logo of the league sponsor Svenska Spel as well as the Superettan logo on the right sleeve of their shirt. 

Note: Flags indicate national team as has been defined under FIFA eligibility rules. Players and Managers may hold more than one non-FIFA nationality.

League table

Playoffs
The 13th-placed and 14th-placed teams of Superettan meet the two runners-up from 2018 Division 1 (Norra and Södra) in two-legged ties on a home-and-away basis with the team from Superettan finishing at home.

Syrianska FC won 3–2 on aggregate.

 
4–4 on aggregate. Varbergs BoIS won on away goals.

Positions by round

Season statistics

Top scorers

Top assists

Hat-tricks

References

External links 

 Swedish Football Association - Superettan

Superettan seasons
2018 in Swedish association football leagues
Sweden
Sweden